Anthidium undulatum is a species of bee in the family Megachilidae, the leaf-cutter, carder, or mason bees.

Synonyms
Synonyms for this species include:
Anthidium littorale Morawitz, 1874
Proanthidium undulatum holozonium Mavromoustakis, 1939
Proanthidium undulatum wahrmani Mavromoustakis, 1948
Anthidium (Proanthidium) undulatum holozonium (Mavromoustakis, 1939)
Anthidium (Proanthidium) undulatum wahrmani (Mavromoustakis, 1948)
Anthidium (Proanthidium) undulatum creticum'' Tkalců, 2003

References

undulatum
Insects described in 1873